The IIFA Award Hottest Pair was first introduced in 2011. The award goes to a pair that have stood out and been appreciated by the Indian audiences. Unlike the other awards this one is chosen by the viewers. The winner is announced in July.

Winners

See also
 IIFA Awards
 Bollywood
 Cinema of India

References 

International Indian Film Academy Awards